Pentagramma vittatifrons is a species of delphacid planthopper in the family Delphacidae. It is found in North America. It feeds on the plant Schoenoplectus pungens.

References

Articles created by Qbugbot
Insects described in 1876
Asiracinae